Tonna berthae is a species of large sea snail or tun snail, a marine gastropod mollusc in the family Tonnidae, the tun shells.

Distribution
This species is endemic to South Africa.

Shell description
The shell height is up to about 90 mm.

References

 Bouchet, P.; Fontaine, B. (2009). List of new marine species described between 2002-2006. Census of Marine Life.

External links 
 http://www.marinespecies.org/aphia.php?p=taxdetails&id=389269

Endemic fauna of South Africa
Tonnidae
Gastropods described in 2005